The Italian Catholic diocese of Trapani is in Sicily. It is a suffragan of the archdiocese of Palermo.

History

Trapani was subject to the see of Mazzara, from the Norman Conquest until 1844, when the diocese was created. Its first bishop was the Redemptorist Vincenzo M. Marolda.

Bishop Francesco Miccichè was removed on May 19, 2012 from the office of bishop of this diocese.Ad of 2021 the diocese Is held up by Pietro Maria Fragnelli, which in May 2015 has been appointed as responsible of the commission for family, life and youth within the Episcopal Conference of Italy.

Ordinaries
Vincenzo Maria Marolda, C.SS.R. (1844–1851 Resigned)
Vincenzo Ciccolo Rinaldi (1853–1874 Died)
Giovanni Battista Bongiorni (1874–1879 Appointed, Bishop of Caltagirone)
Francesco Ragusa (1879–1895 Died)
Stefano Gerbino di Cannitello, O.S.B. (1895–1906 Resigned)
Francesco Maria Raiti, O. Carm. (1906–1932 Died)
Ferdinando Ricca (1932–1947 Died)
Filippo Jacolino (1947–1950 Died)
Corrado Mingo (1950–1961 Appointed, Archbishop of Monreale)
Francesco Ricceri (1961–1978 Retired)
Emanuele Romano (1978–1988 Retired)
Domenico Amoroso, S.D.B. (1988–1997 Died)
Francesco Miccichè (1998 – 19 May 2012 Removed)
Pietro Maria Fragnelli (2013– )

Notes

External links
 Official page

Trapani
Trapani